The General Electric GE9X is a high-bypass turbofan developed by GE Aviation exclusively for the Boeing 777X. It first ran on the ground in April 2016 and first flew on March 13, 2018; it powered the 777-9's maiden flight in early 2020. It received its Federal Aviation Administration (FAA) type certificate on September 25, 2020. Derived from the General Electric GE90 with a larger fan, advanced materials like ceramic matrix composites (CMCs), and higher bypass and compression ratios, it was designed to improve fuel efficiency by 10% compared to the GE90.

Development
In February 2012, GE announced studies on a more efficient derivative of the GE90, calling it the GE9X, to power both the -8/9 variants of the new Boeing 777X.

In 2016, its list price was US$M.

The first engine was expected to be ground-tested in 2016, with flight testing to begin in 2017 and certification happening in 2018. Because of the delays, the first flight test occurred in March 2018, with certification expected in late 2019.

Ground testing

The first engine to test (FETT) completed its first run in April 2016.  This engine completed 375 cycles in 335 hours run-time, which validated the engine design in terms of aerodynamic performance, mechanical system behaviour and secondary air system heat management.

The GE9X conducted icing tests in Winter 2017. The FETT was used for ground cold weather testing in natural icing conditions such as ground fog; minor design changes using additive manufacturing were made within one month.  Icing certification and evaluation finished during the 2017-2018 winter at Winnipeg, Manitoba.

Simulated high-altitude conditions were used to test the GE9X for ice crystal icing (core icing) which was an issue for the GEnx. This testing improved the understanding of core icing as well as the more familiar rime ice. A design change required for the GEnx was the addition of bypass doors between the booster and high-pressure compressor which open into the airflow path to reduce the chance of ice crystals entering the core.

Design changes between FETT and second engine to test (SETT) addressed improvements required to meet efficiency goals: the minimum area in the duct between the HP turbine outlet and the LP turbine inlet  was altered to set the operating line of the compressor, turbine and fan. The tip clearance at the front of the HP compressor was modified as a result of early running experience. SETT testing started on May 16, 2017, at Peebles, Ohio, 13 months after FETT; it was the first engine built to the finalized production standard for certification. During the FAA 150 hr block test, the variable stator vane (VSV) lever arm failed and its redesign led to a 3–month delay. SETT was followed by four more test engines by May 2018.

The certification program began in May 2017. Eight additional engines were involved for certification, as well as one for ETOPS certification installed in the aircraft nacelle. A core engine was tested in the Evendale, Ohio, altitude test cell to check blade vibrations and engines 003, 004, and 007 were assembled in 2017, and the fourth engine was used for flight testing later in the year from Victorville, California. In 2018 ten compliance engines (including two spare engines) were needed for the four 777-9 flight-test aircraft. Type certification was planned for the fourth quarter of 2018.

The block test engine ran at its operational limits, at triple red-line conditions: maximum fan speed, maximum core speed, and maximum exhaust gas temperature. Icing tests started in Winnipeg at the end of 2017. The initial 777X flight-test engines were shipped in 2018 for an initial 777-9 flight in early 2019. A quarter of the certification testing was done by May 2018: icing, crosswind/inlet distortion, inlet distortion , fan and booster blade vibrations,  turbine blade vibrations and thermal survey.

Flight testing 

As it was larger than the GE90, the GE9X could only be installed under the wing on the Boeing 747-400 with its larger main gear struts and bigger tires and not the previous 747-100 GE testbed. The engine was tilted 5° more than the GE CF6. Boeing built a specially designed pylon for the testbed. Suspended on a  strut, the fourth engine of the program began flight testing at the end of 2017.

In February 2018, the GE9X's first flight was delayed by problems discovered in the HPC variable stator vanes (VSV) lever arms. Also a routine A Check on the 747 testbed CF6 engines discovered fan-case corrosion and HP turbine airfoils on allowable limits.  It first flew on March 13 with the previous design of the VSV lever arm. In early May, the first flight test phase of two was completed after 18 flights and 110 hours of run time: the GE9X high-altitude envelope was explored and its cruise performance evaluated. the second phase was scheduled to begin in the third quarter.

By October 2018, half of the certification was completed, and eight development engines were used, mostly in Peebles, Ohio: #1 was stored; a fan blade was deliberately separated from the fan hub of #2 at takeoff thrust for the blade-out test; #3 was used for crosswind ground testing and cyclic and load testing of the thrust reverser cascade assembly; #4 explored  boundaries of the flight envelope such as low altitudes; #5 ran an endurance test with rotors deliberately unbalanced to make the engine shake at the vibration limits allowed in service, a requirement for ETOPS certification; #6 did ingestion tests later in 2018; after LP turbine over-temperature tests, #7 did a second icing test phase in Winnipeg, Manitoba; #8 did the triple redline FAA 150 h endurance test. Eight compliance engines, plus two spares, were required for 777-9 flight testing.

A second phase, of 18 flights, began on December 10 to evaluate the engine control software and hot-and-high performance and lasted until the first quarter of 2019 before FAA certification the same year. By then water ingestion, crosswind, blade-out, hailstone, bird ingestion and block or endurance testing had been completed. Flight tests were based in Victorville, California, and ranged as far as Seattle, Colorado Springs, Colorado, Fairbanks, Alaska, and Yuma, Arizona.

By January 4, 2019, eight test flights and 55 hours of run time had been completed. At the end of January, the turbine case and rear frame strut were damaged during the blade out test and relevant components were redesigned. In early May, the flight test program was completed after 320 hours run time, during which high-altitude cruise fuel burn was established. Engines were modified to a final certifiable configuration standard before the maiden flight of the 777X, delayed beyond the previously expected June 26 by a stator problem at the front of the 11-stage high-pressure compressor. Before certification, final tests included a full durability block test, replacing the usual "triple redline" test at maximum EGT  and both rotor speeds, as modern high-bypass ratio engines cannot achieve all maximum conditions near sea level. The high-pressure compressor stator redesign delayed engine certification into autumn, which delayed the 777X first flight until January 2020.

On January 25, 2020, the GE9X had its first flight on the 777X, flying for 3 hours and 52 minutes, before landing at Boeing Field.
On September 28, GE announced its FAA type certificate, as eight test engines completed 8,000 cycles and 5,000 hours of running.
ETOPS approval needed 3,000 ground-test cycles to be completed as a requirement for entry into service.

Design

The GE9X increases fuel efficiency by 10% over the GE90. Its 61:1 overall pressure ratio should help provide a 5% lower thrust specific fuel consumption (TSFC) than the XWB-97 with maintenance costs comparable to the GE90-115B. The initial thrust of  will be followed by  derated variants. GE invested more than $2 billion for its development.

Most of the efficiency increase comes from the better propulsion efficiency of the higher-bypass-ratio fan. The bypass ratio is planned for 10:1. The fan is housed in  diameter case. It has 16 blades, whereas the GE90 has 22 and the GEnx has 18. This makes the engine lighter, and allows the low pressure (LP) fan and booster to spin faster to better match its speed with the LP turbine. The fan blades feature steel leading edges and glass-fibre trailing edges to better absorb bird strikes with more flexibility than carbon fiber. Fourth generation carbon fiber composite materials, comprising the bulk of the fan blades, make them lighter, thinner, stronger, and more efficient. Using a composite fan case will also reduce weight.

The high pressure (HP) compressor is up to 2% more efficient. As the  GE90 fan left little room to improve the bypass ratio, GE looked for additional efficiency by upping the overall pressure ratio from 40 to 60, focusing on boosting the high-pressure core's ratio from 19:1 to 27:1 by using 11 compressor stages instead of 9 or 10, and a third-generation, twin-annular pre-swirl (TAPS) combustor instead of the previous dual annular combustor. Able to endure hotter temperatures, ceramic matrix composites (CMC) are used in two combustor liners, two nozzles, and the shroud up from the CFM International LEAP stage 2 turbine shroud. CMCs are not used for the first-stage turbine blades, which have to endure extreme heat and centrifugal forces. These are improvements planned for the next iteration of engine technology.

The first-stage HP turbine shroud, the first- and second-stage HP turbine nozzles and the inner and outer combustor linings are made from CMCs, only static components, operating  hotter than nickel alloys with some cooling. CMCs have twice the strength and one-third the weight of metal. The compressor is designed with 3D aerodynamics and its first five stages are blisks, combined bladed-disk. The combustor is lean burning for greater efficiency and 30% NOx margin to CAEP/8. The compressor and high pressure turbine are made from powdered metal. The low-pressure turbine airfoils made of titanium aluminide (TiAl) are stronger, lighter, and more durable than nickel-based parts. 3D printing is used to manufacture parts that would otherwise be impossible to make using traditional manufacturing processes. CMCs need 20% less cooling.

Specifications

See also

References

Notes

External links 

 
 GE9X press

High-bypass turbofan engines
GE9X
2010s turbofan engines